Topuz is a Turkish surname. Notable people with the surname include:

 Fatma Aliye Topuz (1862–1936), Turkish novelist
 Mehmet Topuz (born 1983), Turkish footballer
 Mert Topuz (born 2001), Turkish footballer
 Seyhun Topuz (born 1942), Turkish sculptor

See also
 Topuz, Sungurlu

Turkish-language surnames